Amplorhinus multimaculatus, commonly known as the many-spotted snake or the Cape reed snake, is a species of mildly venomous snake in the family Pseudoxyrhophiidae. The species, which is native to southern Africa, is monotypic (only one species in the genus) in the genus Amplorhinus.

Geographic range
A. multimaculatus is found in Mozambique, South Africa, and Zimbabwe.

Habitat
The preferred natural habitats of A. multimaculatus are freshwater wetlands, grassland, shrubland, and forest.

Description

Diet
A. multimaculatus preys on frogs and lizards.

Reproduction
A. multimaculatus is viviparous. Usually four to eight young are born in late summer. Each neonate measures  in total length (including tail).

Venom
If a human is bitten by A. multimaculatus, the venom may cause localized swelling, inflammation, and pain. The venom is delivered by enlarged grooved teeth at the rear of the mouth.

References

Further reading
Boulenger GA (1896). Catalogue of the Snakes in the British Museum (Natural History). Volume III., Containing the Colubridæ (Opisthoglyphæ and Proteroglyphæ) ... London: Trustees of the British Museum (Natural History). (Taylor and Francis, printers). xiv + 727 pp. + Plates I–XXV. (Amplorhinus multimaculatus, p. 125).
Smith A (1847). Illustrations of the Zoology of South Africa; Consisting Chiefly of Figures and Descriptions of the Objects of Natural History Collected during an Expedition into the Interior of South Africa, in the Years 1834, 1835, and 1836; Fitted out by "The Cape of Good Hope Association for Exploring Central Africa:" Together with a Summary of African Zoology, and an Inquiry into the Geographical Ranges of Species in that Quarter of the Globe. London: Lords Commissioners of her Majesty's Treasury. (Smith, Elder and Co., printers). Plates + unnumbered pages of text. (Amplorhinus multimaculatus, new species, Plate LVII).

Pseudoxyrhophiidae
Monotypic snake genera
Snakes of Africa
Reptiles of Mozambique
Reptiles of South Africa
Reptiles of Zimbabwe
Taxa named by Andrew Smith (zoologist)
Reptiles described in 1847